Güneri of Karaman  was the third bey of  Karaman Beylik, a Turkish principality in Anatolia in the 13th century.
 
His father was Karaman Bey. After his elder brother Mehmet I was executed by the Mongols in 1277, he became the leader of the beylik. Early years of his reign were eventless. But in 1284 he took advantage of the civil war in  Seljuk lands and he supported two infants for the Seljuk throne (not much different from the policy of Mehmet I.)  In turn, he was declared a beylerbey of Seljuks. But upon the intervention of Arghun (Mongol khan) he had to recede to his own territory to the south of Seljuk lands. In 1287 he attacked Tarsus, then a part of the Armenian Kingdom of Cilicia.  However Seljuks and Mongols who supported Leon II of Armenia invaded his territory, burned his capital Karaman and forced him to recede once more. Next year he accepted the suzerainty of Seljuks. In 1294, he recaptured Alaiye an important port on the Mediterranean Sea which was recently captured by a coalition of Armenians and the Kingdom of Cyprus from the Seljuks.

He died in 1300. He was succeeded by his brother Mahmut.

References

Karamanids
1300 deaths
Year of birth unknown
13th-century monarchs in the Middle East
Ethnic Afshar people